The 2009 Home Depot Center USTA Challenger was a professional tennis tournament played on outdoor hard courts. It was part of the 2009 ATP Challenger Tour. It took place in Carson, California, United States between January 26 – February 2, 2009.

Singles main-draw entrants

Seeds

Rankings are as of January 19, 2009.

Other entrants
The following players received wildcards into the singles main draw:
  Lester Cook
  Alex Kuznetsov
  Michael McClune
  Tim Smyczek

The following players received entry from the qualifying draw:
 Cecil Mamiit
 Travis Rettenmaier
 Artem Sitak
 Kaes Van't Hof

Champions

Men's singles

 Wayne Odesnik def.  Scoville Jenkins, 6–4, 6–4

Men's doubles

 Scott Lipsky /  David Martin def.  Lester Cook /  Donald Young, 7–6(3), 4–6, [10–6]

References
Official website
ITF search 

Home Depot Center USTA Challenger
USTA LA Tennis Open